Hot Spring County is located in the U.S. state of Arkansas. As of the 2020 census, the population was 33,040. The county seat is Malvern. Hot Spring County was formed on November 2, 1829, from a portion of Clark County. It was named for the hot springs at Hot Springs, Arkansas, which were within its boundaries until Garland County was formed in 1873. Up until November 2022, it was an alcohol prohibition or dry county. However, there was no record of this law.

Hot Spring County comprises the Malvern, AR Micropolitan Statistical Area, which is included in the Hot Springs-Malvern, AR Combined Statistical Area.

Geography

Hot Spring County is located in Southwest Arkansas, a region composed of the Ouachita Mountains, deep valleys, and the Arkansas Timberlands. Hot Spring County is mostly within the mountainous segment of the region, mostly covered in hardwood and pine forests. One of the six primary geographic regions of Arkansas, the Ouachitas are a mountainous subdivision of the U.S. Interior Highlands. The Ouachita River roughly divides the county.

Hot Spring County is surrounded by six counties, including the Ouachitas, Central Arkansas, and Lower Arkansas Delta, due to its short and wide shape. The county neighbors Garland County to the north, Saline County in the northeast corner, Grant County to the east, Dallas County to the southeast, Clark County to the south, and a small portion with Montgomery County in the northwest.

Protected areas
Hot Spring County contains two state parks, DeGray Lake Resort State Park and Lake Catherine State Park, and two Wildlife Management Area (WMA), DeGray Lake WMA, and Jack Mountain WMA maintained by the Arkansas Game and Fish Commission. The county also contains  of Ouachita National Forest managed by the National Forest Service.

DeGray Lake Resort State Park is a 984-acre (398 ha) in southwest Hot Spring County, and Arkansas's only resort state park. The 94-room DeGray Lodge and Convention Center includes a restaurant and 18-hole championship rated golf course. Traditional state park amenities for camping, hiking, fishing, boating, picnic tables, and horseback riding are also offered. The park is owned and operated by the Arkansas Department of Parks and Tourism (ADPT). DeGray Lake WMA essentially bounds the portions of lake shoreline not bounded by the state park. The land is owned by the United States Army Corps of Engineers (USACE) and extends into Clark County.

Near Malvern, Lake Catherine State Park is a small state park on the west side of Lake Catherine. The park offers 20 cabins, including five Civilian Conservation Corps cabins of natural wood and stone built in the 1930s, and 70 campsites. In summer, the parks offers a marina, boat rental, visitor center, guided tours, nature center and horseback trail rides.

Demographics
From 2000 to 2010, Hot Spring County saw significant population and income growth. The population increased from 30,353 to 32,923, a gain of 8.5%, with incomes rising and poverty declining for almost every demographic.

2020 Census

As of the 2020 United States census, there were 33,040 people, 12,599 households, and 8,857 families residing in the county.

2010 Census
As of the 2010 census, there were 32,923 people, 12,664 households, and 8,969 families residing in the county. The population density was 53.5 people per square mile (20.4/km2). There were 14,332 housing units at an average density of 23.3 per square mile (8.9/km2). The racial makeup of the county was 85.6% White, 10.8% Black or African American, 0.5% Native American, 0.3% Asian, >0.1% Pacific Islander, 1.0% from other races, and 1.7% from two or more races. 2.8% of the population were Hispanic or Latino of any race.

There were 12,664 households, out of which 32.0% had children under the age of 18 living with them, 53.6% were married couples living together, 12.3% had a female householder with no husband present, and 29.2% were non-families. 25.2% of all households were made up of individuals, and 10.6% had someone living alone who was 65 years of age or older. The average household size was 2.48 and the average family size was 2.94.

In the county, the population was spread out, with 23.3% under the age of 18, 8.4% from 18 to 24, 24.3% from 25 to 44, 28.3% from 45 to 64, and 15.7% who were 65 years of age or older. The median age was 40.1 years. For every 100 females there were 95.8 males. For every 100 females age 18 and over, there were 102.5 males age 18 and over.

The median income for a household in the county was $37,150, and the median income for a family was $46,090. Males had a median income of $34,111 versus $27,127 for females. The per capita income for the county was $18,248. About 8.2% of families and 12.3% of the population were below the poverty line, including 13.0% of those under age 18 and 8.9% of those age 65 or over.

2000 Census

As of the 2000 census, there were 30,353 people, 12,004 households, and 8,834 families residing in the county. The population density was 49 people per square mile (19/km2). There were 13,384 housing units at an average density of 22 per square mile (8/km2). The racial makeup of the county was 87.33% White, 10.26% Black or African American, 0.45% Native American, 0.22% Asian, 0.04% Pacific Islander, 0.44% from other races, and 1.26% from two or more races. 1.27% of the population were Hispanic or Latino of any race.

There were 12,004 households, out of which 31.80% had children under the age of 18 living with them, 59.20% were married couples living together, 10.60% had a female householder with no husband present, and 26.40% were non-families. 23.50% of all households were made up of individuals, and 11.10% had someone living alone who was 65 years of age or older. The average household size was 2.50 and the average family size was 2.94.

In the county, the population was spread out, with 25.10% under the age of 18, 8.20% from 18 to 24, 26.50% from 25 to 44, 24.50% from 45 to 64, and 15.80% who were 65 years of age or older. The median age was 38 years. For every 100 females there were 95.50 males. For every 100 females age 18 and over, there were 93.00 males.

The median income for a household in the county was $31,543, and the median income for a family was $37,077. Males had a median income of $27,800 versus $19,461 for females. The per capita income for the county was $15,216. About 10.30% of families and 14.00% of the population were below the poverty line, including 19.00% of those under age 18 and 14.20% of those age 65 or over.

Human resources

Education

Educational attainment in Hot Spring County is typical for a rural Arkansas county, with a 2011-2015 American Community Survey study finding 84.8% of Hot Spring County residents over age 25 held a high school degree. This ratio is in line with the state average of 84.8% and slightly below the national average of 86.7%. The county's percentage of residents holding a bachelor's degree or higher is 13.0%, significantly below state and national averages of 21.1% and 29.8%, respectively.

Primary and secondary education

Five public school districts are based in Hot Spring County: Malvern School District is the largest school district in Hot Spring County, with the Bismarck School District serving the western portion of the county, Ouachita School District serving a small area around Donaldson, Glen Rose School District serving the northeastern area of the county, and Magnet Cove School District around Magnet Cove. Successful completion of the curriculum of these schools leads to graduation from Malvern High School, Bismarck High School, Ouachita High School, Glen Rose High School, and Magnet Cove High School respectively. All five high schools offer Advanced Placement (AP) courses and are accredited by the Arkansas Department of Education (ADE).

Residents outside the five Hot Spring County-based districts are within either the Centerpoint School District or Poyen School District.

Higher education
Hot Spring County contains one institution of higher education, ASU Three Rivers, a public community college in Malvern. Other higher education institutions in the region include National Park College, a public two-year college in Hot Springs, and two four-year liberal arts universities in Arkadelphia, Henderson State University and Ouachita Baptist University.

Library system
The Malvern-Hot Spring County Library at 202 East Third Street in downtown Malvern was founded in 1928 and became a member library of the Mid-Arkansas Regional Library System in 1974. The facility offers books, e-books, media, reference, youth, business and genealogy services.

Public safety
The Hot Spring County Sheriff's Office is the primary law enforcement agency in the county. The agency is led by the Hot Spring County Sheriff, an official elected by countywide vote every two years.

The county is under the jurisdiction of the Hot Spring County District Court, a state district court. State district courts in Arkansas are courts of original jurisdiction for criminal, civil (up to $25,000), small claims, and traffic matters. State district courts are presided over by a full-time District Judge elected to a four-year term by a districtwide election. Hot Spring County District Court is located at 410 Locust Street in Malvern.

Superseding district court jurisdiction is the 7th Judicial Circuit Court, which covers Hot Spring and Grant counties. The 7th Circuit contains two circuit judges, elected to six-year terms circuitwide. Circuit courts have the right to refer some matters to state district court at their discretion.

Hot Spring County 911 is the local PSAP operating system for the entire county area. Hot Spring County 911 is run by Director Regina Shearin.

Government

The county government is a constitutional body granted specific powers by the Constitution of Arkansas and the Arkansas Code. The quorum court is the legislative branch of the county government and controls all spending and revenue collection. Representatives are called justices of the peace and are elected from county districts every even-numbered year. The number of districts in a county vary from nine to fifteen, and district boundaries are drawn by the county election commission. The Hot Spring County Quorum Court has nine members. Presiding over quorum court meetings is the county judge, who serves as the chief operating officer of the county. The county judge is elected at-large and does not vote in quorum court business, although capable of vetoing quorum court decisions.

Politics
Hot Spring County is represented in the Arkansas State Senate by Republican Alan Clark, a Hot Springs businessman. In the Arkansas House of Representatives, it is represented  by a Republican as well, Laurie Rushing, a real estate broker from Hot Springs.

Until 2004, Hot Spring County was a typical "Solid South" Democratic county in presidential elections. There were, however, 3 exceptions. Republicans Herbert Hoover and Richard Nixon won the county in 1928 and 1972, respectively, while American Independent candidate George Wallace won the county in 1968. In 2004, Republican candidate George W. Bush won the county by just 59 votes. However, since 2008, the county has given over 60 percent of its vote to the Republican candidate.

Taxation

Property tax is assessed by the Hot Spring County Assessor annually based upon the fair market value of the property and determining which tax rate, commonly called a millage in Arkansas, will apply. The rate depends upon the property's location with respect to city limits, school district, and special tax increment financing (TIF) districts. This tax is collected by the Hot Spring County Collector between the first business day of March of each year through October 15th without penalty. The Hot Spring County Treasurer disburses tax revenues to various government agencies, such as cities, county road departments, fire departments, libraries, and police departments in accordance with the budget set by the quorum court.

Sales and use taxes in Arkansas are voter approved and collected by the Arkansas Department of Finance and Administration.
Arkansas's statewide sales and use tax has been 6.5% since July 1, 2013. Hot Spring County has an additional sales and use tax of 1.50%, which has been in effect since January 1, 2009. Within Hot Spring County, the City of Malvern has had an additional 1% sales and use tax since January 1, 2009, City of Rockport an additional 2% since January 1, 2012, and the Town of Perla an additional 1% sales and use tax since January 1, 1984. The Arkansas State Treasurer disburses tax revenue to counties and cities in accordance with tax rules.

Communities
Two incorporated cities, four incorporated towns, and one census designated place (CDP) are located within the county. The largest city and county seat, Malvern, is located in the northeast part of the county on I-30. Malvern's population in 2010 was 10,318, and has been increasing since the 2000 Census. Rockport and Perla are adjacent to Malvern, with populations of 755 and 291 in 2010, respectively. The remaining communities are in the south part of the county near the Ouachita River, each with a population under 400 as of 2010: Donaldson, Friendship and Midway. Magnet Cove is a former town, suspending incorporation in 2006.

Hot Spring County has dozens of unincorporated communities and ghost towns within its borders. This is due to early settlers in Arkansas tending to settle in small clusters rather than incorporated towns. For example, communities like Jones Mill have a post office or a collection of buildings. Other communities are simply a few dwellings at a crossroads that have adopted a common place name over time. Some are officially listed as populated places by the United States Geological Survey, and others are listed as historic settlements.

Cities
 Malvern (County Seat)
 Rockport

Towns
 Donaldson
 Friendship
 Midway
 Perla

Census Designated Places
 Bismarck
 Jones Mill
 Magnet Cove

Other unincorporated communities

 Abco
 Antioch
 Beaton
 Bonnerdale
 Brown Springs
 Butterfiield
 Caney
 Central
 De Roche
 Diamondhead
 Faber
 Gifford
 Glen Rose
 Harp
 Lambert
 Landers
 Lono
 Morning Star
 Mount Moriah
 Oak Bower
 Oak Grove
 Old De Roche
 Oma
 Point Cedar
 Rolla
 Saginaw
 Shorewood Hills
 Social Hill
 Whittington
 Witherspoon

Historical communities

 Cove Creek
 Duffie
 Durian
 Elmore
 Etta
 Fleming
 Sanders
 Twin Oak
 Walco
 Wayside
 Wyandotte

Townships

Antioch
Big Creek
Bismarck
Brown Springs
Butterfield (part of Rockport and Malvern)
Clear Creek
De Roche
Dover
Fenter (Perla, most of Malvern, part of Rockport)
Gifford
Harrison
Henderson
Lone Hill (part of Midway)
Magnet (Magnet Cove)
Midway
Montgomery
Ouachita (Donaldson)
Prairie (Friendship, most of Midway)
Saline
Valley

Infrastructure

Aviation
Hot Spring County contains one public owned/public use general aviation airport, Malvern Municipal Airport southeast of Malvern. For the twelve-month period ending July 31, 2015, the facility saw 11,850 general aviation operations and 150 military operations. The nearest commercial service airport is Clinton National Airport in Little Rock.

Major highways

 Interstate 30
 U.S. Highway 67
 U.S. Highway 70
 U.S. Highway 270
 Highway 7
 Highway 9
 Highway 51
 Highway 84
 Highway 128
 Highway 171
 Highway 222
 Highway 283
 Highway 347

See also

List of dry counties in Arkansas
List of counties in Arkansas
 List of lakes in Hot Spring County, Arkansas
National Register of Historic Places listings in Hot Spring County, Arkansas

Notes

References

Further reading

External links

Malvern and Hot Spring County Library
Hot Spring County Sheriff's Office

 
1829 establishments in Arkansas Territory

Populated places established in 1829